This is a list of yearly Ivy League football standings.

Ivy League standings

References

Ivy League
Standings